Alberto Amaro Corona (born 8 April 1963) is a Mexican politician from the Party of the Democratic Revolution. From 2006 to 2009 he served as Deputy of the LX Legislature of the Mexican Congress representing Tlaxcala.

References

1963 births
Living people
Politicians from Tlaxcala
Party of the Democratic Revolution politicians
21st-century Mexican politicians
Members of the Congress of Tlaxcala
Municipal presidents in Tlaxcala
Mexican educators
Deputies of the LX Legislature of Mexico
Members of the Chamber of Deputies (Mexico) for Tlaxcala